Laurel Race Track is a passenger rail station on the MARC Camden Line between the District of Columbia's Washington Union Station and Baltimore's Camden Station. The station was built in 1911, by the Baltimore and Ohio Railroad to serve the Laurel Park race track, as is indicated by the station's eponymous name.

Service at this station is very limited.  Only evening south/westbound trains (to Washington) stop at this station, and it is a flag stop, meaning that trains only stop if passengers need to get on or off.

Nearby places and attractions
 North Laurel
 Laurel
 Maryland City
 Russett
 Laurel Park Racecourse
 North Laurel Community Center

Transit-oriented development
The transit-oriented development community of Laurel Park station is planned to be constructed just north of the station and racecourse off of Whiskey Bottom Road. The new community calls for 1,000 mixed residential units, 127,000 square feet of retail space, and 650,000 square feet of office space.

Station layout
The station has two side platforms. The station is not compliant with the Americans with Disabilities Act of 1990, lacking raised platforms for level boarding as well as tactile paving along the edges of the platform.

References

External links
 Google map of the station
 TrainWeb images:
 Horse statue, pedestrian underpasses, and former staircase
 1911-built staircase and Wooden platforms

Camden Line
MARC Train stations
Former Baltimore and Ohio Railroad stations
Buildings and structures in Howard County, Maryland
Railway stations in Howard County, Maryland
Buildings and structures in Anne Arundel County, Maryland
Railway stations in Anne Arundel County, Maryland
1910 establishments in Maryland
Railway stations in the United States opened in 1911